Bellville is a city in the U.S. state of Texas and the seat of Austin County. The city's population was 4,206 at the 2020 census. Bellville is on the eastern edge of the Texas-German belt, and Bellville is known for its German culture and descendants of those Germans still call Bellville home. Bellville was named for Thomas B. Bell, one of Stephen F. Austin's earliest colonists, after he and his brother donated land for the new county seat established by voters in 1846. San Felipe had been the county seat before the war for independence.

State Highway 36 and State Highway 159 intersect at Bellville, as do FM 529, FM 1456, and FM 242.

Geography

Bellville is located in Northern Austin County at  (29.947225, –96.258657).

Demographics

As of the 2020 United States census, there were 4,206 people, 1,614 households, and 923 families residing in the city.

As of the census of 2000, there were 3,794 people, 1,425 households, and 966 families living in the city. The population density was 1,452.0 people per square mile (561.3/km2). There were 1,566 housing units at an average density of 599.3 per square mile (231.7/km2). The racial makeup of the city was 81.89% White, 11.68% African American, 0.40% Native American, 0.34% Asian, 3.95% from other races, and 1.74% from two or more races. Hispanic or Latino of any race were 11.97% of the population.

There were 1,425 households, out of which 34.7% had children under the age of 18 living with them, 52.6% were married couples living together, 11.6% had a female householder with no husband present, and 32.2% were non-families. 27.9% of all households were made up of individuals, and 15.3% had someone living alone who was 65 years of age or older. The average household size was 2.52 and the average family size was 3.11.

In the city, the population was spread out, with 26.4% under the age of 18, 8.3% from 18 to 24, 25.3% from 25 to 44, 20.2% from 45 to 64, and 19.7% who were 65 years of age or older. The median age was 38 years. For every 100 females, there were 90.9 males. For every 100 females age 18 and over, there were 85.1 males.

The median income for a household in the city was $40,806, and the median income for a family was $49,730. Males had a median income of $36,719 versus $21,685 for females. The per capita income for the city was $17,671. About 4.5% of families and 8.0% of the population were below the poverty line, including 7.9% of those under age 18 and 8.1% of those age 65 or over.

Education

Bellville Independent School District serves Bellville.

Schools

 Bellville High School (Grades 9–12)
 Bellville Junior High School (Grades 6–8)
 O'Bryant Intermediate School (4–5)
 O'Bryant Primary School (PK–3)
 West End Elementary School (K–5)
 Faith Academy of Bellville (PK–12)

Climate
The climate in this area is characterized by relatively high temperatures and evenly distributed precipitation throughout the year.  The Köppen Climate System describes the weather as humid subtropical, and uses the abbreviation Cfa.

Notable people

 Beau Bell, Major League Baseball player
 Juke Boy Bonner Blues musician
 William Crump, first Speaker of the Texas House of Representatives following statehood
 Johnny Holland, NFL linebacker and coach
 Ernie Koy, Major League Baseball player
 Ernie Koy Jr., NFL player
 Ted Koy, NFL player
 Lucas Luetge, MLB pitcher
 Leo Meyer, elected as mayor of Bellville in 1895, later moved to Oklahoma where he became the first Jewish-Oklahoman elected to statewide public office
 Emmanuel Sanders, NFL wide receiver 
 David Smith, reality television show contestant
 Doug Supernaw, country music artist

Photo Gallery

References

External links

 City of Bellville official website
 Bellville Chamber of Commerce
 Handbook of Texas Online article

Cities in Texas
Cities in Austin County, Texas
County seats in Texas
Greater Houston